Shmuel Kamenetsky (born November 1924) is a Lithuanian–American ultra-Orthodox (Haredi) rabbi. He is the co-founder and rosh yeshiva (dean) of the Talmudical Yeshiva of Philadelphia. He is also a member of the Moetzes Gedolei HaTorah (Council of Torah Sages).

Biography
Rabbi Shmuel Kamenetsky was born in Tytuvėnai, Lithuania to Rabbi Yaakov Kamenetsky, then that town's rabbi. After the family's emigration in 1937, he attended Eitz Chaim Day Schools in Toronto, then studied at Ner Israel Rabbinical College under his father's cousin, Yaakov Yitzchok Ruderman. He went on to study at Lakewood Yeshiva, becoming a primary student of Aharon Kotler, from whom he received rabbinic ordination. In the mid-1950s, as part of the Lakewood Yeshiva's effort to establish out-of-town yeshivas, Kamenetsky and Dov Schwartzman were sent to found the Talmudical Yeshiva of Philadelphia. In 1955, Schwartzman departed to open his own yeshiva in Israel, and Kamenetsky called upon Elya Svei to serve as co-rosh yeshiva. This arrangement continued until Svei's death in March 2009.

Rabbi Kamenetsky is a member of the Moetzes Gedolei HaTorah of Agudath Israel of America and serves on the rabbinical board of organizations including Chinuch Atzmai (Torah Schools for Israel), Torah Umesorah, the Chofetz Chaim Heritage Foundation, and the Association for Jewish Outreach Professionals (AJOP). His opinion is frequently sought and quoted on current issues such as same-sex attraction, child molestation, obesity and dieting, smoking, and drinking alcohol to excess on Purim.

Rabbi Kamenetsky and his wife Temi believe that vaccines are more harmful than the diseases they prevent. He said, "I see vaccinations as the problem. It's a hoax. Even the Salk vaccine is a hoax. It is just big business". He has supported the idea that a child cannot be refused entry into a school for refusing to vaccinate. During the COVID-19 pandemic, Kamenetsky denied that he ever instructed anyone to refuse to take the vaccine, stating that a letter publicized to this effect was a forgery. In a rebuttal letter, he stated his opinion that each individual should ask his own doctor.Many students say that they personally heard him tell people to ask their doctor if they should take the covid vaccine.

In July 2020, Kamenetsky endorsed the Donald Trump 2020 presidential campaign, stating "Yes, I think people should vote for him. He’s done a good job. It’s hakaras hatov."

Personal
Kamenetsky's wife, Temi, was the daughter of Mordechai Brooks, a hazzan. She grew up in Brooklyn, New York, and died on January 10, 2022.

References

External links 
MP3 audio shiurim by Rabbi Shmuel Kamenetsky
Audio lectures by Rabbi Kamenetsky
Audio lectures by Rabbi Kamenetsky
Pictures and audio from Rabbi Kamenetsky's visit to Shapell's
Pictures of Rabbi Kamenetsky
Rabbi Kamenetsky visiting a yeshiva in Israel

1924 births
20th-century American rabbis
21st-century American rabbis
American Haredi rabbis
Beth Medrash Govoha alumni
Lithuanian emigrants to the United States
Moetzes Gedolei HaTorah
Rabbis from Pennsylvania
Rosh yeshivas
Living people